Motteram is a surname. Notable people with the surname include:

Carl Motteram (born 1984), English footballer
Cecil Augustus Motteram ( 1853–1943), England-born Australian baker

See also
 Mottram